SS Colemere was a small freighter built during the First World War. Completed in 1915, she was intended for the West African trade. The ship was sunk by the German submarine SM U-105 in December 1917 with the loss of four crewmen.

Description 
She had a vertical triple-expansion steam engine driving a single screw propeller. The engine was rated at a total of 173 nominal horsepower and produced .

Construction and career 
Colemere, named after Cole Mere, was laid down as yard number 279 by Dunlop, Bremner and Co. at its shipyard in Port Glasgow, Scotland for the Watson Steamship Co. The ship was launched on 17 December 1914 and completed on 9 March 1915. She was sold to the Lever Brothers' newly formed Bromport Steamship Co. on 11 May 1916.

References

Bibliography

Ships built on the River Clyde
Steamships of the United Kingdom
Maritime incidents in 1917
World War I merchant ships of the United Kingdom
1914 ships
Ships of the Bromport Steamship Company